Top and bottom can mean more than one thing.

In the context of particle physics:
 Top quark
 Bottom quark

In the context of sexuality:
 Top, bottom and versatile, for penetrative acts
Top, bottom, switch (BDSM), for BDSM interaction

In mathematics:
 the greatest element and least element of a partially ordered set